Lemon mint is a common name for several plants and may refer to:

Eau de Cologne mint
Melissa officinalis
Monarda citriodora, native to the southern United States and northern Mexico
Lemon mint might also refer to the Mint lemonade drink.

Herbs